Marian Collier may refer to:
 Marian Collier (actress) (1931–2021), American film and television actress
 Marian Collier (painter) (1859–1887), British 19th-century painter